Artisa Ukru (Quechua artisa wooden boat, ukru hole, pit, hollow, "boat pit", also spelled Artezaucro) is a mountain in the Andes of Peru which reaches a height of approximately . It is located in the Huánuco Region, Huamalíes Province, Llata District.

References 

Mountains of Peru
Mountains of Huánuco Region